The Elmira Colonels (also known as the Rosies) were an American basketball team based in Elmira, New York that was a member of the American Basketball League. It is, to date, the only major league sports team to have ever resided in the Southern Tier.

Year-by-year

References

Basketball teams in New York (state)
Defunct basketball teams in the United States
Elmira, New York